The Taiwan International Ethnographic Film Festival (TIEFF) is the oldest and longest running international ethnographic film festival in Asia. Founded in 2001 in collaboration with Academia Sinica, the biennial festival features new and classic works from ethnographic filmmakers around the world.

Each year the festival organizes around a central theme, curating a selection of films and organizing discussions that explore a specific aspect of human life. TIEFF also includes a “New Visions” category that showcases notable ethnographic films made within the past two years. While the selection process is highly competitive, the festival does not include a competition in the event, in order to present each film as equally valuable.

TIEFF is organized by the Taiwan Association of Visual Ethnography (TAVE), a non-profit organization that works to raise public awareness around documentary and ethnographic films. With this foundation, TIEFF serves as a forum for education, discussion, community building, and global exchange. The festival has also been a source of consistent support for indigenous cinema in Taiwan, promoting upcoming directors and introducing local works to international audiences.

Festival themes 
Each year the festival curates a selection of films around a specific topic. Past themes include:

 2019: Visions of Sovereignty
2017: Beyond the Human
2015: Scenes of Life
 2013: Beyond Borders
 2011: Suffering and Rebirth
 2009: Body and Soul
 2007: Indigenous Voices
 2005: Family Variations
 2003: Migration Story
 2001: Island Odyssey

References

External links 

 Official Site

2001 establishments in Taiwan
Ethnography
Film festivals in Taiwan
Film festivals established in 2001